Seal Point is a lighthouse on Cape St. Francis in the Eastern Cape of South Africa. The lighthouse is operational and houses a museum. Public access to the top of the tower is allowed in the company of a guide.

Construction on the lighthouse started in November 1875 and it became operational on 4 July 1878. Total construction cost was £20,000.

The Lighthouse was used by SANCOB to house penguins and other birdlife. This was until its closure in recent years. Currently, the area around the lighthouse has been developed into bike paths.

See also

 List of lighthouses in South Africa

References

External links 
 
 South African Lighthouses

Lighthouses completed in 1878
Lighthouses in South Africa
Buildings and structures in the Eastern Cape
Museums in the Eastern Cape
Maritime museums in South Africa
Lighthouse museums
South African heritage sites